In mathematics, in the areas of topology and functional analysis, the Anderson–Kadec theorem states that any two infinite-dimensional, separable Banach spaces, or, more generally, Fréchet spaces, are homeomorphic as topological spaces. The theorem was proved by Mikhail Kadets (1966) and Richard Davis Anderson.

Statement 

Every infinite-dimensional, separable Fréchet space is homeomorphic to  the Cartesian product of countably many copies of the real line

Preliminaries 

Eidelheit theorem: A Fréchet space  is either isomorphic to a Banach space, or has a quotient space isomorphic to 

Kadec renorming theorem: Every separable Banach space  admits a Kadec norm with respect to a countable total subset  of  The new norm is equivalent to the original norm  of  The set  can be taken to be any weak-star dense countable subset of the unit ball of

Sketch of the proof 

In the argument below  denotes an infinite-dimensional separable Fréchet space and  the relation of topological equivalence (existence of homeomorphism).

A starting point of the proof of the Anderson–Kadec theorem is Kadec's proof that any infinite-dimensional separable Banach space is homeomorphic to 

From Eidelheit theorem, it is enough to consider Fréchet space that are not isomorphic to a Banach space. In that case there they have a quotient that is isomorphic to  A result of Bartle-Graves-Michael proves that then 

for some Fréchet space 

On the other hand,  is a closed subspace of a countable infinite product of separable Banach spaces  of separable Banach spaces. The same result of Bartle-Graves-Michael applied to  gives a homeomorphism

for some Fréchet space  From Kadec's result the countable product of infinite-dimensional separable Banach spaces  is homeomorphic to 

The proof of Anderson–Kadec theorem consists of the sequence of equivalences

See also

Notes

References

 .
 .

Topological vector spaces
Theorems in functional analysis
Theorems in topology